Verdecchia is a surname. Notable people with the surname include:

Guillermo Verdecchia (born 1962), Canadian playwright
Luca Verdecchia (born 1978), Italian sprinter